My Heart is a 2003 classical-crossover album by Norwegian singer Sissel Kyrkjebø released in Norway. In 2004 a new version was released in the US and Japan with several new songs.

Track listing

Norway release
 Romance
 Lascia Che Io Pianga
 Mon cœur s'ouvre à ta voix
 Wait A While
 Tristezze
 Hymne
 Ich hatte viel Bekümmerniss
 Oblivion
 Pie Jesu
 The Sleeping Princess
 Deborah's Theme

US and Japan release
 Wait A While
 Lascia ch'io pianga
 Someone Like You
 Tristezza
 Angel Rays
 Mon cœur s'ouvre à ta voix
 Pie Jesu
 Oblivion
 You Raise Me Up
 O Mio Babbino Caro
 Ave Maria
 Deborah's Theme (from Once Upon A Time In America)

Charts

Weekly charts

Year-end charts

External links
Review of My Heart by Norwegian newspaper Adressa (04 December 2003)

References

Sissel Kyrkjebø albums
2003 albums